Stewart Ginn (born 2 June 1949) is an Australian professional golfer.

Early life 
Ginn was born in Melbourne. He grew up behind the twelfth green of the Royal Melbourne Golf Club. Early in his life "he used to caddy at Royal Melbourne." He then moved on to be a golf manager at the club.

Professional career 
In the 1970s and 1980s he won several professional tournaments on the PGA Tour of Australasia and one on the European Tour, the 1974 Martini International. He also played regularly on the Asia Golf Circuit, winning three tournaments, and on the Japan Golf Tour, where he has one win. He won the inaugural PGA Tour of Australia Order of Merit in 1973. In 1979 he won the Australian PGA Championship at Royal Melbourne at 284 (E). He defeated Bob Shearer and Bob Charles by three shots.

As a senior, he played full-time on the U.S.-based Champions Tour from 2000 to 2004. His one official money win at that level came at one of the senior majors, the 2002 Senior Players Championship.

Professional wins (19)

European Tour wins (1)

Japan Golf Tour wins (1)

PGA Tour of Australasia wins (10)

PGA Tour of Australasia playoff record (2–4)

Sources:

Other Australasian wins (1)
1974 Victorian PGA Championship

Asia Golf Circuit wins (3)
1977 Malaysian Open
1986 Benson & Hedges Malaysian Open
1992 Indian Open

Senior PGA Tour wins (1)

European Senior Tour wins (1)

European Senior Tour playoff record (0–1)

Other senior wins (1)
2004 Liberty Mutual Legends of Golf - Raphael Division (with Bob Charles)

Results in major championships

Note: Ginn only played in The Open Championship.

CUT = missed the half-way cut (3rd round cut in 1981 Open Championship)
"T" = tied

Senior PGA Tour major championships

Wins (1)

Team appearances
UBS Warburg Cup (representing the Rest of the World): 2001, 2002

References

External links

Australian male golfers
PGA Tour of Australasia golfers
European Tour golfers
Japan Golf Tour golfers
European Senior Tour golfers
PGA Tour Champions golfers
Winners of senior major golf championships
Golfers from Melbourne
Sportsmen from Victoria (Australia)
People from Beaumaris, Victoria
Sportspeople from Kuala Lumpur
1949 births
Living people